Mount Evans or Mountevans may refer to:

Mount Evans, a peak in Colorado
Mount Evans (Montana), a peak in Anaconda, MT 59711 USA
Mount Evans (Alberta), a summit
Mount Evans (Antarctica), a mountain
Baron Mountevans, an English peerage title
The codename for Intel's E2000 infrastructure processing unit (IPU) chip

See also
Evans Peak